Berkner is a lunar impact crater that is located on the far side of the Moon, just past the western limb. It is attached to the east-southeast rim of the crater Parenago. Just to the south is the Robertson, and to the southeast is Helberg.

The outer rim of this crater has been worn and eroded, particularly along the northwest half. The most intact part of the rim is to the southeast, while the remainder has been impacted and notched by smaller impacts, and to the southwest overlain by material.

Satellite craters
By convention these features are identified on lunar maps by placing the letter on the side of the crater midpoint that is closest to Berkner.

References

 
 
 
 
 
 
 
 
 
 
 
 

Impact craters on the Moon